Pablo Oscar Ortega Vargas (born 29 August 1994) is an Argentine professional footballer who plays as a midfielder for Club Olimpo.

Career
Ortega played for local club Villa Dolores at youth level, as well as Atalaya. Talleres signed the midfielder in 2009. Five years later, Ortega made his debut in the Copa Argentina against Alumni; having previously appeared as an unused substitute in the same competition versus Newell's Old Boys three months prior. His first appearance in league football arrived in Torneo Federal A on 7 December 2014 during a match with Gimnasia y Esgrima, prior to his first goal versus Defensores de Belgrano in the following June. In January 2016, Ortega joined Liga Premier de México side Tlaxcala on loan. Four goals in twelve games followed.

He returned to Argentina and Talleres in June 2016, subsequently departing a year later to sign for Torneo Federal A's Central Córdoba. He netted goals over Defensores de Belgrano (2), Libertad, Crucero del Norte, Estudiantes and Juventud Unida Universitario as the club won promotion to Primera B Nacional in his first season. His professional debut came on 26 August 2018 during a draw with Deportivo Morón.

Career statistics
.

Honours
Talleres
Torneo Federal A: 2015

Central Córdoba
Torneo Federal A: 2017–18

References

External links

1994 births
Living people
Sportspeople from Córdoba Province, Argentina
Argentine footballers
Association football midfielders
Argentine expatriate footballers
Expatriate footballers in Mexico
Argentine expatriate sportspeople in Mexico
Torneo Federal A players
Liga Premier de México players
Primera Nacional players
Talleres de Córdoba footballers
Tlaxcala F.C. players
Central Córdoba de Santiago del Estero footballers
Ferro Carril Oeste footballers
Olimpo footballers